Starck may refer to:

Claude and Starck, an American architectural firm
Edel & Starck, a German television series
P. A. Starck Piano, an American manufacturer

Various aircraft designed by Andre Starck:
Starck AS-27 Starcky, a French single-seat aircraft
Starck AS-37, a French two-seat light aircraft
Starck AS-57, a French two-seat light aircraft
Starck AS-70 Jac, a French single-seat light aircraft 
Starck AS-80 Holiday, a French two-seat light aircraft

See also
Starck (surname)
Stark (disambiguation)